The Barrows is an unincorporated community in Berkeley County, in the U.S. state of South Carolina.

History
The community was so named on account of barrows (tumuli) near the original town site.

References

Unincorporated communities in South Carolina
Unincorporated communities in Berkeley County, South Carolina